Union Chapel, also known as Mitchell Hollow Union Chapel, is a historic chapel on Mill Road in Windham, Greene County, New York.  It was built in 1897 and is a one-story, three by three bay, wood-frame structure resting on a stone and concrete foundation.  It is sheathed in narrow clapboards and features a fully pedimented portico and a two-stage bell tower.  It was built by the local Methodist Episcopal and Presbyterian congregations.

It was added to the National Register of Historic Places in 2001.

References

Properties of religious function on the National Register of Historic Places in New York (state)
Neoclassical architecture in New York (state)
Churches completed in 1897
19th-century Methodist church buildings in the United States
Churches in Greene County, New York
National Register of Historic Places in Greene County, New York
Neoclassical church buildings in the United States